Aleksandr Sergeyevich Balandin (born 20 June 1989) is a retired Russian gymnast. He is known for his work on the rings and has three skills named after him on this apparatus. He placed fourth in the rings at the 2012 Olympics.

Career
He is known for his three skills – Balandin 1, Balandin 2 and Balandin 3. Balandin 1 is "From hang vertical pull up with straight arms to maltese cross". Balandin 2 is "From hang vertical pull up with straight arms to inverted cross". Balandin 3 is "From hang vertical pull up with straight arms to planche". Balandin 1 and Balandin 3 are valued as E while Balandin 2 is valued at F from the scale A to I in the Code of Points, which is used to show the difficulty of an element in gymnastics.

In August 2011 he broke his thigh bone during the Russian Cup, underwent surgery and was out of competition for six months.

2012 Summer Olympics
Balandin competed at the 2012 Olympic Games in London as a member of the Russian MAG team. The team finished sixth with a score of 269.603 pts. Individually he placed fourth in the rings with a score of 15.666 pts.

2013–present 
Balandin competed at the 2013 World Championships in Antwerp. He qualified for the still rings final and won the silver medal – Russia's only MAG medal of the championships. At these championships he performed his eponymous skill which was officially named the Balandin 3.

In 19–25 May, at the 2014 European Championships in Sofia, Balandin contributed a score of 15.633 (rings) for Russia and along with teammates (Denis Ablyazin, David Belyavskiy, Nikita Ignatyev, Nikolai Kuksenkov) won Russia the team event gold medal with a total score of 267.959, ahead of Great Britain. In the event finals, Balandin tied for the gold medal with teammate Denis Ablyazin – both scored 15.800 points.

After suffering injuries for 3 years, Balandin announced his retirement in September 2017 due to his past shoulder injury, he began working as a coach. He has studied a master's programme in sports studies at Smolensk State Academy of Physical Education, Sport and Tourism.

See also
List of Olympic male artistic gymnasts for Russia

References

External links 
 
 Aleksandr Balandin at sportgymrus.ru 

1989 births
Living people
Russian male artistic gymnasts
People from Petrozavodsk
Gymnasts at the 2012 Summer Olympics
Olympic gymnasts of Russia
Medalists at the World Artistic Gymnastics Championships
European champions in gymnastics
Universiade medalists in gymnastics
Universiade gold medalists for Russia
Universiade silver medalists for Russia
Medalists at the 2009 Summer Universiade
Sportspeople from the Republic of Karelia
21st-century Russian people